Greg Brenman is an English film and television producer.

As previous Head of Drama at UK's Tiger Aspect Productions, he produced over 400 hours of British TV drama.  Titles include Peaky Blinders, Ripper Street, My Mad Fat Diary, Prisoners' Wives, Robin Hood and Secret Diary of a Call Girl.

In film, Brenman has produced films such Omagh, White Girl, and Billy Elliot.

In 2013, Brenman, with colleague Roanna Benn, formed Drama Republic, a new specialty drama production company. Drama Republic produced Doctor Foster, which Brenman is an executive producer of.

In 2017, it was announced that Brenamn would executive produce the Hugo Blick series The Forgiving Earth, which will air on BBC Two and Netflix.

Awards and honors
 BAFTA Awards
 2000: Alexander Korda Award to Greg Brenman, Jonathan Finn, Stephen Daldry for Most Outstanding Film of the Year - Billy Elliot
 2005: Best Single Drama for Omagh, Greg Brenman, Ed Guiney, Paul Greengrass, Pete Travis & Guy Hibbert
 2009: Best Single Drama for White Girl

References

External links
 News. Drama Republic

British television producers
British media executives
Living people
Year of birth missing (living people)